Takhti Tehran is a multi-purpose stadium, located in Eastern Tehran, Iran. It is used mostly for football matches.  The stadium is able to hold 30,122 people and was opened in 1973. Recently, Takhti Stadium has been brought back to life. It has been given a new grass field and seats. Takhti Stadium is home venue of Saipa F.C. Takhti Stadium is the first covered stadium in Iran. It is named after Gholamreza Takhti.

History
Takhti Stadium is the fifth big stadium that was built in East Tehran. This stadium was built to use for 1974 Asian Games and is part of Takhti Sport Complex. The stadium's building progress was started in June 1968 and Iranian-Italian architect, Jahangir Darvish was responsible for the project. It was opened on 3 June 1973 and was named Farah Stadium in honor of Farah Pahlavi, Iran's ex-empress. Almost two years after the Munich Olympic Stadium opened in 1968 to host the 1972 Summer Olympics, International Journal of skeletons Baucn und wohncn paper wrapping published an article about Takhti Stadium and named the stadium as one of the most modern stadiums in the world. Takhti Sport Complex is currently the second best in facilities in Tehran after Azadi Sport Complex.

Building

The stadium is on the crest of Farah and stadium is a logo of Farah's crown. Grandstands also is based from crown's logo. It is also similar to Munich Olympic Stadium. The stadium is the first that used cable system for its coverage. The general idea of plan is designed to a horseshoe stadium so that all viewers are on the one hand and the West and to the North and the South to continue with minimal space. Underlying cause maximum holding time from 2 pm onwards that all viewers Tournament match up against the sun as much as possible and be on equal terms. On the other hand, this solution will enable to display Nmabshat national and field competitions in the East as a night scene can be enormous. The main objective was to design a cover for the viewers as almost more than 2/3 (two thirds) of the shadow of the cable shield to the project. The geometric skeleton of a horse saddle is covered. 2 - Coverage of the rigid concrete stadium and attached to the side of the other side as a domestic non-rigid composite cable is inhibited. In this series, sports such as athletics, cycling and tennis is played. Also, in the halls, multi-purpose sports complex activities, such as bodybuilding (women and men), volleyball, basketball, soccer and gymnastics training to be done. With a capacity of 35,000 football pitches for official matches, 12 earth, and six pitches for local matches, artificial grass and pool and sauna is considered.

Events
The stadium was used during 1974 Asian Games as the second venue. It was also hosted Iran national football team matches in group and semi-finals matches of 2008 West Asian Football Federation Championship. 2010 Islamic Solidarity Games was planned to be held at this stadium but the tournament was cancelled.

The final match of Hazfi Cup in 2014–15 season took place in this stadium on 1 June 2015. During this match Zob Ahan won their third title after defeating Naft Tehran.

2008 WAFF matches

References

External links
Official website of the Takhti Tehran Sports Complex

Sports venues in Tehran
Football venues in Iran